Lewis Nixon may refer to:

 Lewis Nixon (naval architect) (1861–1940), shipbuilding executive, ship designer, and political activist
 Lewis Nixon III (1918–1995), World War II US Army officer in the 101st Airborne Division, known for his portrayal in the miniseries Band of Brothers, grandson of the above